This list of Ports and harbours in Libya details the ports, harbours around the coast of Libya.

List of ports and harbours in Libya

External links

References

Ports

Libya